

118001–118100 

|-bgcolor=#f2f2f2
| colspan=4 align=center | 
|}

118101–118200 

|-id=102
| 118102 Rinjani || 2254 T-3 || Rinjani, the 3726-m active volcano situated in Indonesia on the island of Lombok. || 
|-id=172
| 118172 Vorgebirge ||  ||  a foothills located west of the Rhine. The long ridge extends from Bonn to Cologne || 
|-id=173
| 118173 Barmen ||  || The German city of Barmen (now incorporated into Wuppertal), whence the 1934 Synod issued the Barmen Declaration defining Protestant opposition to the National-Socialist ideology || 
|-id=178
| 118178 Rinckart ||  || Martin Rinckart (1586–1649), a German author, composer, and theologian, who wrote the ecumenical hymn Nun danket alle Gott ("Now thank we all our God") || 
|-id=194
| 118194 Sabinagarroni || 1994 SG || Sabina Garroni (born 1972), Italian amateur astronomer || 
|}

118201–118300 

|-id=214
| 118214 Agnesediboemia ||  || Agnese di Boemia (1211–1282), princess Anezka of the Premyslid family || 
|-id=230
| 118230 Sado ||  || Sado island, in the Sea of Japan, the place where Noh drama (one of the "World's Intangible Cultural Treasures") was born || 
|-id=233
| 118233 Gfrancoferrini ||  || Gianfranco Ferrini (born 1962), an Italian amateur astronomer and member of the astrometry team at Beppe Forti Astronomical Observatory  in Montelupo Fiorentino, Tuscany. || 
|-id=235
| 118235 Federico ||  || Federico Colombini (born 1989) an Italian software engineer at the University of Modena and Reggio Emilia, and  nephew of amateur astronomer Ermes Colombini, who is one of the uncredited discoveries of this minor planet at the San Vittore Observatory. || 
|}

118301–118400 

|-bgcolor=#f2f2f2
| colspan=4 align=center | 
|}

118401–118500 

|-
| 118401 LINEAR ||  || Lincoln Near-Earth Asteroid Research (LINEAR), an astronomical survey which discovered numerous minor planets. This object is classified both as asteroid and comet (176P/LINEAR). || 
|-id=418
| 118418 Yangmei ||  || The Central Academy of Fine Arts (Yangmei) is China's top institution of higher art education and a world-renowned art school. Since its establishment in 1918, CAFA has played a leading role in the development of Chinese art, as well as art education. || 
|}

118501–118600 

|-id=554
| 118554 Reedtimmer ||  || Reed Timmer (born 1980) is an American meteorologist and avid storm chaser. Reed has a love of public outreach and education. He shoots intense videos of the most dangerous weather events on the planet while also gathering important data. || 
|}

118601–118700 

|-bgcolor=#f2f2f2
| colspan=4 align=center | 
|}

118701–118800 

|-id=768
| 118768 Carlosnoriega ||  || Carlos I. Noriega was born in 1959 in Peru and became an astronaut in 1996. He was a mission specialist for both the Space Shuttle Atlantis mission that docked with the Mir Space Station and the Space Shuttle Endeavour mission to deliver and install solar arrays to the International Space Station. || 
|-id=769
| 118769 Olivas ||  || John D. Olivas (born 1966) is a former American astronaut. Olivas flew two Space Shuttle missions to assemble the International Space Station (in 2007 and 2009). He conducted five space walks during those two missions. || 
|}

118801–118900 

|-bgcolor=#f2f2f2
| colspan=4 align=center | 
|}

118901–119000 

|-id=945
| 118945 Rikhill ||  || Richard E. Hill (born 1949), American amateur astronomer who turned professional, known for his outreach activities. He worked with the Catalina Sky Survey, searching for potentially hazardous objects, and is a discoverer of minor planets and several comets such as 195P/Hill. || 
|}

References 

118001-119000